The Pointe des Ecandies is a mountain of the Mont Blanc Massif, located between Trient and Champex in the canton of Valais. It is located north of the Pointe d'Orny and east of the Trient Glacier.

References

External links
 Pointe des Ecandies on Hikr

Mountains of the Alps
Mountains of Valais
Mountains of Switzerland
Two-thousanders of Switzerland